Leonid Ivanovich Tkachenko (born 1 October 1953) is a Ukrainian-Russian football coach and a former Soviet player. He is an assistant coach with FC Baltika Kaliningrad.

Career
Tkachenko spent most of his career playing for FC Metallist Kharkiv, leading the club to promotion from the Soviet First League to the Soviet Top League in 1981.

Together with Mykola Pavlov served as an interim coach for Ukraine national football team when it contested Belarus in a friendly against the Belarus national football team. He and Pavlov were assistant coaches to Viktor Prokopenko before then. Sometime in 2000, he relocated to the Russian Federation and obtained Russian citizenship.

Honours
 Russian Second Division Zone West best manager: 2005.

References

 

1953 births
Living people
People from Kirovske Raion
Soviet footballers
Ukrainian football managers
Ukraine national football team managers
FC Metalist Kharkiv players
FC Baltika Kaliningrad players
FC Metalist Kharkiv managers
FC Temp Shepetivka managers
FC Baltika Kaliningrad managers
FC Sokol Saratov managers
FC Anzhi Makhachkala managers
FC Dynamo Saint Petersburg managers
Russian Premier League managers
Russian football managers
Ukrainian Premier League managers
Merited Coaches of Ukraine
Association football defenders